Scolecitrichidae is a family of copepods belonging to the order Calanoida.

Genera

Genera:
 Amallothrix Sars, 1925
 Archescolecithrix Vyshkvartzeva, 1989
 Bertalda

References

Copepods